At the 2004 Summer Olympics, the athletics events were held at the Athens Olympic Stadium from August 18 to August 29, except for the marathons (run from Marathonas to the Kallimarmaro Stadium), the race walks (on the streets of Athens), and the shot put (held at the Ancient Olympia Stadium). A total of 46 events were contested, of which 24 by male and 22 by female athletes.

Medal winners

Men

* Athletes who participated in the heats only and received medals.

Women

* Athletes who participated in the heats only and received medals.

Medal table

Participating nations
A total of 197 nations participated in the different Athletics events at the 2004 Summer Olympics.

Notes
After the announcement of the disqualification for doping of the athlete Yuri Bilonog (UKR), who won the gold medal at the time, there was a new distribution of medals in March 2013. The IOC upgraded original silver medalist Adam Nelson (USA) to gold, bronze medalist Joachim Olsen (DEN) to silver, and fourth place finisher Manuel Martínez (ESP) to bronze.
Ivan Tsikhan (BLR), was disqualified due to doping. There was no decision of the IOC to redistribute the medals.
Crystal Cox (USA), who ran in the preliminary round of a relay team, admitted to using anabolic steroids from 2001 to 2004. The IOC decided to revoke the gold medal from Crystal Cox and asked the IAAF to make its decision about the US squad. The IOC and IAAF announced that the result would stand due to the fact that, according to the rules of the time, a team should not be disqualified because of a doping offense by an athlete who did not compete in finals.
 Russian athlete Irina Korzhanenko lost her gold medal in women's shot put due to doping, with Cuban Yumileidi Cumbá Jay replacing her as the Olympic champion, German Nadine Kleinert receiving the silver medal, and Svetlana Krivelyova of Russia receiving the bronze medal. Krivelyova was later stripped of her bronze for the same reason.
Iryna Yatchenko (BLR), was disqualified due to doping. The IOC decided that the bronze medal was reallocated to the athlete Věra Pospíšilová-Cechlová (CZE) during the IOC Executive Board on 30 May 2013.

References

External links
 
 Official result book – Athletics

 
2004 Summer Olympics events
2004
Olympics
2004 Olympics
2004 Olympics